Thomas Schmidberger (born 23 October 1991) is a German para table tennis player. He has won two world titles and six European titles in para table tennis tournaments.

References

External links
 
 

1991 births
Living people
German male table tennis players
Paralympic table tennis players of Germany
Paralympic silver medalists for Germany
Paralympic medalists in table tennis
Table tennis players at the 2012 Summer Paralympics
Table tennis players at the 2016 Summer Paralympics
Table tennis players at the 2020 Summer Paralympics
Medalists at the 2012 Summer Paralympics
Medalists at the 2016 Summer Paralympics